

Events

February events 
 February 26 – The Somerville and Easton Railroad, a predecessor of the Central Railroad of New Jersey, is chartered.

March events
 March 9 – The Richmond and Danville Railroad is chartered in Virginia.
 March 15 – The Amiens-Boulogne line in France opens between Abbeville and Étaples.
 March 16 – The Leeds and Bradford Extension Railway opens between Shipley and Keighley in West Yorkshire, England.
 March – First ever 4-6-0 locomotive, the Chesapeake, completed by the Norris Locomotive Works for the Philadelphia and Reading Railroad.

April events 
 April 19 – The Mohawk and Hudson Railroad, a predecessor of the New York Central Railroad, officially changes its name to Albany and Schenectady Railroad.

May events 
 May 24 – The Dee bridge disaster: a cast iron girder bridge across the river Dee at Chester, England, designed by Robert Stephenson for the Chester and Holyhead Railway, collapses under a Shrewsbury and Chester Railway train with five fatalities.
 May 31 – The first railway connection between Rotterdam and The Hague opens in the Netherlands.

June events
 June – The first Bradshaws Continental Railway Guide timetable is published by George Bradshaw in England.
 June 26 – Opening of first railway wholly within modern-day Denmark, from Copenhagen to Roskilde.

July events
 July 9 – The Lancashire and Yorkshire Railway is incorporated as an amalgamation of several important railway lines in Northern England.
 July 28 – Bristol and Exeter Railway's Clevedon branch line opens.

August events
 August 9 – Opening of first railway wholly within Switzerland, the Swiss Northern Railway from Zürich to Baden.

September events
 September 22 – The Railway Clearing House in Great Britain recommends that Greenwich Mean Time be adopted as the standard time for all railways in the United Kingdom.

October events
 October – Portland Company's locomotive erecting shops opened for business.

December events
 December 1
 The London and North Western Railway opens its Trent Valley Line to give a more direct route for the West Coast Main Line to North West England, bypassing Birmingham.
 The first time zone in the world is established by British railways with GMT hand-carried on chronometers.

Unknown date events
 John Urpeth Rastrick retires from Foster, Rastrick and Company, the English firm that built the first steam locomotives for the Delaware and Hudson Railroad.

Births

October births
 October 6 – Webb C. Ball, watchmaker who introduced the first truly reliable and accurate timepieces on American railroads.

Deaths
 November 16 – Thomas Kirtley, locomotive superintendent of North Midland Railway 1843–1844, and London, Brighton and South Coast Railway in 1847, dies (b. 1811).

References